Batyr Atdayev is the incumbent  Deputy Chairman of the Cabinet of Ministers for Trade, Textile Industry, and Entrepreneurship. Immediately prior to this, he was Prosecutor General of Turkmenistan.

Early life 
Atdayev graduated from the Law Faculty of the Turkmen State University in the early 1990s.

Career 
In February 2016, Atdayev was appointed one of several Deputy Chairpersons of Turkmenistan’s Cabinet of Ministers and tasked with overseeing commercial trade and foreign economic relations. 

On 13 May 2017, he was appointed by President Berdimuhamedow as the new Prosecutor General, replacing Amanmyrat Hallyyev. On 5 November 2021, Berdimuhamedow publicly reprimanded him for "improper performance of official duties and weakening of prosecutorial supervision over the activities of the oil and gas complex."

On 4 June 2022 he was reappointed to the Cabinet of Ministers as Deputy Chairman for Trade, Textile Industry, and Entrepreneurship, and simultaneously relieved of his duties as Prosecutor General. On 8 July 2022 he was also assigned responsibility for oversight of Ahal Province.

Notes

References 

Prosecutors general of Turkmenistan
Turkmenistan lawyers
Year of birth missing (living people)
Living people